Chesters is a  country estate near Ancrum, located on the banks of the River Teviot in the Scottish Borders area of Scotland. The estate includes a listed house, workers houses, gardens and extensive grounds. National Grid Reference NT 60842 22512.

History 
The house was built for Thomas Elliot Ogilvie who purchased the estate in 1787 with money he obtained while working for the Madras Civil Service. Five years before he had married Hannah Pasley (born Dashwood). By 1790 it had been re- designed by local Borders architect William Eliot for Thomas and Hannah Ogilvie.

Emily Gerard, a writer who inspired Bram Stoker's Dracula, was born here in 1849.

Steve Hislop the motorcyclist was born in Chesters in 1962.

In 2008 and 2011, the house appeared in episodes of the Channel 4 television series Country House Rescue, starring Ruth Watson.

See also
List of places in the Scottish Borders
List of places in Scotland

References

External links
CANMORE/RCAHMS record for Chesters House
RCAHMS record for Chesters House, stables, Gate Lodge, and Cottages
Chesters Estate website

Houses completed in 1787
Category A listed buildings in the Scottish Borders
Listed houses in Scotland
Country houses in the Scottish Borders
1787 establishments in Scotland